In geology and sedimentology, connate fluids are liquids that were trapped in the pores of sedimentary rocks as they were deposited.  These liquids are largely composed of water, but also contain many mineral components as ions in solution.

As rocks are buried, they undergo lithification and the connate fluids are usually expelled.  If the escape route for these fluids is blocked, the pore fluid pressure can build up, leading to overpressure.

Significance 

An understanding of the geochemistry of connate fluids is important if the diagenesis of the rock is to be quantified.  The solutes in the connate fluids often precipitate and reduce the porosity and permeability of the host rock, which can have important implications for its hydrocarbon prospectivity.  The chemical components of the connate fluid can also yield information on the provenance of aquifers and of the thermal history of the host rock. Minute bubbles of fluid are often trapped within the crystals of the cementing material. These fluid inclusions provide direct information about the composition of the fluid and the pressure-temperature conditions that existed during diagenesis of the sediments.

Some analyses of connate water samples from Louisiana (USA) compared to seawater

Similar, but different in origin, is the concept of fossil water, which is used to describe very old groundwater found in deep aquifers or bedrock. Typically it was recharged during a different climatic period (e.g., the last ice age) so is also very old, but possibly not of the same genesis as the rock.

See also 
 Petroleum geology

References

 Connate water at Schlumberger Oilfield Glossary

Petroleum
Sedimentology
Soil mechanics